Atypical chemokine receptor 3 also known as C-X-C chemokine receptor type 7 (CXCR-7) and G-protein coupled receptor 159 (GPR159) is a protein that in humans is encoded by the ACKR3 gene.

This gene encodes a member of the G protein-coupled receptor family. This protein was earlier thought to be a receptor for vasoactive intestinal peptide (VIP) and was considered to be an orphan receptor. It is now classified as a chemokine receptor able to bind the chemokines CXCL12/SDF-1 and CXCL11. The protein is also a coreceptor for human immunodeficiency viruses (HIV). Translocations involving this gene and HMGA2 on chromosome 12 have been observed in lipomas. Alternatively spliced transcript variants encoding the same protein isoform have been found for this gene. Whereas some reports claim that the receptor induces signaling following ligand binding, recent findings in zebrafish suggest that CXCR7 functions primarily by sequestering the chemokine CXCL12.

Another study has provided evidence that ligand binding to CXCR7 activates MAP kinases through Beta-arrestins, and thus has functions beyond ligand sequestration.

ACKR3 has also been shown to sequester endogenous opioid peptides, and is thought to modulate their activity. Inhibition of ACKR3 by ligands such as the peptide LIH383 (FGGFMRRK-NH2) increases opioid peptide activity and produces analgesic and antidepressant effects in animal studies.

References

External links

Further reading 

 
 
 
 
 
 
 
 
 
 
 
 
 

Chemokine receptors